Tantalus Media (formerly Tantalus Entertainment and Tantalus Interactive) is an Australian video game developer based in Melbourne. It was founded in 1994 by programmers Andrew Bailey and Trevor Nuridin. Since its inception, Tantalus has developed almost 100 games and has won multiple game awards.

History 
Initially, Tantalus ported games from the PlayStation and arcade to the Sega Saturn. Its first original title was South Park Rally, completed for all four platforms of the time in eighteen months. The fast pipeline was largely attributed to the existing in-house title - 7th Gear. The development team at Tantalus worked on their first handheld games, concurrently developing ATV Quad Power Racing and Woody Woodpecker: Crazy Castle 5 . Kemco delayed the latter's release to July 2002, while the title saw the return of director Trevor Nuridin to coding, taking the lead role in its development; they released Space Race, their first PS2 game, that same year. They used two cross-platform engines: CRIS for handhelds, with skinned mesh rendering, and the Mercury Engine for new generation consoles in its early years.

In the mid-1990s, Tantalus was partly owned by UK developer Perfect Entertainment, which secured contracts with Psygnosis for ports of their popular PlayStation games to the Sega Saturn. During this time, Tantalus was known as Tantalus Entertainment but reverted to Tantalus Interactive after it became independent when separating from Perfect in 1998. Private investment then allowed the business to develop its in-house title 7th Gear to the point it was able to secure a contract from Acclaim to use the game engine for a "kart" style game with the South Park license. The company changed its name to Tantalus Media in 2007 following a hostile buyout from then-CEO Tom Crago who then immediately sold a share to private equity company Netus. In 2010, following the completion of the DS & PSP title Megamind: The Blue Defender, CEO Tom Crago re-acquired the failing studio from Netus.

CRIS (Character Render Interactive System) was developed by CTO Andrew Bailey following discussions with studio producers Stephen Handbury and Arthur Kakouris for use on the Game Boy Advance (GBA). Using a unique procedure, it was able to render 3D mesh on the handheld system. CRIS was used mainly in the 2003 GBA title Top Gear Rally. Released to critical acclaim, it showed the power of a system at its peak, while raising the bar for racing games on hand-held systems. Tantalus won 'Best Game' at the 2003 Australian Game Developer Awards in Melbourne for its effort.

In addition to licensed video games, the developer released two original titles, Trickstar and Black Market Bowling. In 2005, Tantalus' had two prominent original IP titles that did not manage to attract publisher interest. Metal Shell was developed into a playable demo, originally a vehicle shoot-'em-up on the PlayStation 2 in 2003, the feature making it popular was deformable terrain as vehicles and shells exploded. In 2005, new concepts and a short promotional video were developed in-house by the art team, and shown at E3 that year it was promoted as a Battlefield 1942-type game, set in the future.  However, the 2003 promotional video was seen by players of the Toronto-based game's producer Longbow Digital Arts 'Trademarks' tank combat and racing game, and several issues were flagged up, leading to graphical comparisons drawn in a side-by-side fashion; they were incredibly alike, in one case down to exact sprite design.  Tom Crago was contacted directly on the issue and denied any infer of 'copying' (or trying to copy) Trademarks, despite Tantalus holding all of Treadmarks' source material.  Archived video footage of both titles can be found and compared on YouTube.

Anaka was first pitched as a jump n' run title for the Game Boy Advance in 2003, while only a document existed featuring loose details. In 2005 an animation feature short was made with the help of Act3animation as part of a pilot for television. In 2006, a touch-only Nintendo DS demo was created. Players could control the character indirectly by touching the screen where they wanted them to go. It was a mix between a jump n' run and a traditional adventure game.

The developer's best-performing title was the 2007 girl's horse-riding simulator Pony Friends for the Nintendo DS, which sold more than 1 million copies, making it the largest-selling single-format game developed in Australia. Previous work on the Sony PlayStation developing the title Mary-Kate and Ashley: Winners Circle (Acclaim) (the "massive world" technology developed by Andrew Bailey for Winners Circle was largely wasted on a branded title and an aging system) and Equestrian 2001 (Midas) had given the studio the background experience and tools to develop the title. By 2008, Tantalus was running two studios, and during that time, the studio worked on Cars Race-O-Rama and MX Reflex for the Nintendo DS and PSP, as well as Pony Friends 2 for the Wii & Nintendo DS, and Legend of the Guardians: The Owls of Ga'Hoole for the latter system. Shortly after the completion of Cars Race-o-Rama in 2009, the Brisbane studio started work on the company's first digitally distributed title, Drift Street International, for the Nintendo DSi. Meanwhile, the Melbourne office began its career on Megamind for PSP and DS, while also prototyping demos for 360, iPhone, and PS3.

During the last half of 2009, due to a shift in the games industry in Australia, Tantalus Media closed its Brisbane office, while also making much of the staff in the Melbourne office redundant. During the first half of 2010, the company was reduced to a staff of under 18, at a time when many Australian development studios were closing. In the decade since Tantalus briefly re-branded to Straight Right, relocated its entire studio and underwent a number of changes which despite keeping the business branding of 'Tantalus' to this day, heralded a radical change for the developer. During this time, Tantalus Media dabbled in some touch-gaming development and returned to port on Nintendo platforms.

Games

Developer 
 Stargate (SNES – 1994)
 Area 51 (Saturn, PS, PC – 1995)
 Wipeout (Saturn – 1996)
 Krazy Ivan (PS, Saturn, PC – 1996)
 Manx TT Superbike (Saturn, PC – 1997)
 Wipeout 2097 (Saturn – 1997)
 The House of the Dead (Saturn, PC – 1998)
 South Park Rally (DC, N64, PS, PC – 1999)
 Mary-Kate and Ashley Winners Circle (Acclaim – 2001)
 Equestriad 2001 (Midas)
 ATV: Quad Power Racing (PS, GBA – 2002)
 Woody Woodpecker in Crazy Castle 5 (GBA – 2002)
 Monster Truck Madness (GBA – 2003)
 Men in Black II: Alien Escape (GameCube – 2003)
 Unreal II: The Awakening (Xbox – 2003)
 Top Gear Rally (GBA – 2003)
 The Polar Express (GBA – 2004)
 The Adventures of Jimmy Neutron: Boy Genius – Attack of the Twonkies (GBA – 2004)
 SpongeBob SquarePants: The Yellow Avenger (DS, PSP – 2005)
 Trick Star (GBA – 2006)
 MX vs. ATV: On the Edge (PSP – 2006)
 Cars Mater-National Championship (GBA, DS – 2007)
 MX vs. ATV: Untamed (DS, PSP – 2007)
 Pony Friends (DS – 2007)
 The Legend of Spyro: Dawn of the Dragon (DS – 2008)
 Pony Friends 2 (Wii, DS, PC – 2009)
 MX vs. ATV Reflex (PSP, DS – 2009)
 Cars Race-O-Rama (PSP, DS – 2009)
 Legend of the Guardians: The Owls of Ga'Hoole (DS – 2010)
 Megamind (video game) (PSP, DS – 2010)
 Super Speed Machines (DS – 2010)
 Ben 10: Galactic Racing (DS – 2011)
 Shift 2: Unleashed (iOS – 2011)
 Funky Barn (3DS, Wii U – 2012)
 Pony Trails (iOS – 2012, Android – 2015)
 Mass Effect 3: Special Edition (Wii U – 2012)
 Deus Ex: Human Revolution Director's Cut (Wii U – 2013)
 Zombi (PS4, Xbox One, PC – 2015)
 The Legend of Zelda: Twilight Princess HD (Wii U – 2016)
 Sonic Mania (Nintendo Switch – 2017)
 Rime (Nintendo Switch – 2017)
 Cities: Skylines (PS4, Xbox One, Windows 10 - 2017 Nintendo Switch – 2018)
 Age of Empires: Definitive Edition (Microsoft Windows – 2018)
 Stellaris: Console Edition (PS4, Xbox One – 2019)
 Jupiter & Mars (PS4 – 2019)
 Age of Empires II: Definitive Edition (Microsoft Windows – 2019)
 Age of Empires III: Definitive Edition (Microsoft Windows – 2020)
 The Legend of Zelda: Skyward Sword HD (Nintendo Switch – 2021)

Publisher 
 AMF Bowling 2004 – Black Market Games (Xbox – 2003)
 Black Market Bowling – Black Market Games (PS2 – 2005)
 Heat Shield – Black Market Games (iOS – 2009)
 Drift Street International – Tantalus (DSi – 2010)
 Funky Barn Download – Tantalus (Wii U – 2012)

References

External links 
 Official website

2021 mergers and acquisitions
Australian companies established in 1994
Australian subsidiaries of foreign companies
Companies based in Melbourne
Keywords Studios
Video game companies established in 1994
Video game companies of Australia
Video game development companies